Truman Abbe (November 1, 1873 – May 2, 1955) was an American surgeon, son of Cleveland Abbe and brother of Cleveland Abbe, Jr.

Biography
He was born in Washington, D. C. on November 1, 1873. He graduated from Harvard University in 1895.  He received his degree in medicine at Columbia University in 1899, then pursued post-graduate studies at the University of Berlin.

Abbe began work in 1902 at Georgetown University.  Afterwards, he was appointed instructor at George Washington University (1905).  In 1907, he was awarded a silver medal at the Jamestown Exposition for his researches into the uses of radium in medicine.

His papers were donated to the National Library of Medicine in 1983.

References

External links
 Truman Abbe Papers (1894-1933) – National Library of Medicine finding aid

Columbia University Vagelos College of Physicians and Surgeons alumni
Harvard University alumni
Georgetown University faculty
1873 births
1955 deaths
American surgeons
Physicians from Washington, D.C.
Humboldt University of Berlin alumni
George Washington University faculty